Orbi was a wildlife theme park in Yokohama, Japan, which opened on 19 August 2013. The indoor park contained over 12 exhibitions, a shop and an 80-seat café. Orbi's main feature was a 23.4-degree theatre that was 8m tall and 40m wide and which showcased three wildlife films. The park was a joint venture between BBC Earth, the division of the British Broadcasting Corporation, and Sega.

The park permanently closed down on December 31, 2020.

Exhibitions
Animalpedia
Earth Cruising
World Transporter: African Elephants
On location in 4D: Mountain Gorilla
Frozen: Mt. Kenya
Ocean Explorer
Mega Bugs Playground
Earth Canvas
Basecamp
Animal Selfie
Time Capture
Extreme Photospot

Theatre 23.4 shows 
Rise Of The Temple King
Roxy's Island Adventure
Magic of Yellowstone
The Meerkats
Ice Worlds
Voyagers

Orbi Osaka
On 29 January 2016, Sega Live Creation and BBC Earth opened a second Orbi location, in Osaka, Japan. This location closed on September 30, 2018, after the licensing agreement for the location was terminated.

Orbi Dubai

References 

2013 establishments in Japan
2020 disestablishments in Japan
Amusement parks in Japan
Defunct amusement parks in Japan
Sega amusement parks
Buildings and structures in Yokohama
BBC
Joint ventures